Gilberto Angelucci Guión (born 7 August 1967) is a retired Venezuelan football goalkeeper.

Club career
Angelucci spent most of his career playing in Venezuela for a number of different teams. Between 1994 and 1998 he played in Argentina with San Lorenzo de Almagro. Afterwards he returned to Venezuelan football, he was part of the Maracaibo team that won the Primera División in 2004-05.

International career
A Venezuelan international since 1995, Angelucci has been capped 47 times and included 1995 and 2004 Copa América squads.

Honours

Club
San Lorenzo
 Torneo Apertura: 1995

UA Maracaibo
 Primera División: 2004–05

References

External links
 Argentine Primera statistics
 

1967 births
Living people
People from Portuguesa (state)
Venezuelan footballers
Venezuelan people of Italian descent
Association football goalkeepers
Portuguesa F.C. players
Deportivo Táchira F.C. players
Minervén S.C. players
San Lorenzo de Almagro footballers
Deportivo Italia players
A.C.C.D. Mineros de Guayana players
UA Maracaibo players
Venezuela international footballers
1995 Copa América players
2004 Copa América players
Argentine Primera División players
Expatriate footballers in Argentina
Venezuelan expatriate sportspeople in Argentina 
Venezuelan football managers
UA Maracaibo managers
Angostura F.C. managers